Kent Nielsen (born 28 December 1961) is a Danish professional football manager and former player, who is currently the head coach of Silkeborg IF. He was named coach of the year by the Danish Football Association in 2014 after winning both the Danish Superliga and the Danish Cup with AaB. He started his coaching career as caretaker manager of AGF, before getting his breakthrough with AC Horsens, guiding the club to promotion to the top-flight Superliga championship in 2005. He has also coached Superliga clubs Brøndby IF and OB.

In his active career, Nielsen played as a centre back. He won two Danish championships and a Danish Cup trophy with Brøndby IF. He played three years in England with Aston Villa, before ending his career after winning the Danish Cup with AGF. He played 54 games and scored three goals for the Denmark national team, winning the Euro 1992 championship and representing Denmark at the 1986 FIFA World Cup tournament.

Playing career

Club career
The son of former Danish international Erik Nielsen, Kent Nielsen started his career in Erik's former club Brønshøj Boldklub (in Copenhagen), alongside his brother Tommy. Kent Nielsen switched to the Danish team Brøndby IF in 1987, with whom he won the 1987 and 1988 Danish championships, as well as the 1989 Danish Cup. Following 91 first team games for Brøndby, Nielsen left the club in 1989. He was bought by English club Aston Villa for a reported £500,000 transfer fee, and secured himself a place in the starting line-up in his two first seasons with the club. New Aston Villa manager Ron Atkinson did not see Nielsen as fitting into his 4–4–2 tactics and brought in replacement Shaun Teale, and Nielsen looked to leave the club. In early 1992, he moved back to Denmark, to play for AGF Aarhus. He won the 1992 Danish Cup with AGF, before he retired in 1994.

International career
Nielsen started his international career with the Denmark national under-19 football team in July 1979. He was called up for the Denmark national under-21 football team in May 1983. Following two under-21 games, he made his debut for the senior Danish national team on 5 October 1983 in a 1984 Summer Olympics qualification game against Poland, making him the last Brønshøj player until this date, to represent the club on the national squad. He then reverted to the under-21 team. He played his second senior international game in January 1985, and was selected by national team manager Sepp Piontek for the Danish squad at the 1986 World Cup, but spent the entire tournament as an unused substitute. He was a part of Olympic manager Richard Møller Nielsen's team for the 1988 Summer Olympics qualification tournament, but was not called up to Piontek's squad for the Euro 1988.

Under new national team manager Richard Møller Nielsen, Kent Nielsen became a constant member of the Denmark squad. After his return to AGF, he was selected to represent Denmark at the Euro 1992. Nielsen played four of Denmark's five games, including the Euro 1992 final against Germany, where he most famously cleared the ball off the goalline with a bicycle kick, avoiding a goal from Karl-Heinz Riedle. He ended his international career following the 2–0 win against Germany.

Managerial career
Following his retirement, Nielsen spent years as an amateur football manager until he and former Danish international Lars Lundkvist took over as co-managers of AGF in April 2000. He and Lundkvist kept AGF from being relegated, but left the club after the season end. In 2001, he was appointed manager of Danish 1st Division club AC Horsens, which he managed to promotion for the Danish Superliga. Against all odds, he led the team to survive the 2005–06 Superliga season. His success continued during the following season, and he was named 2006 Danish Coach of the Year. In the 2007–08 season, his team finished in a historic fifth place, despite having one of the lowest budgets in the league.

Eventually, Nielsen's achievements with Horsens caught the attention of other clubs. In January 2009, he signed a four-year contract with his former club Brøndby IF. He managed Brøndby to 17 victories in 38 games. In March 2010, he was sacked, following a 1–3 defeat to HB Køge.

On 11 October 2010 he replaced Magnus Pehrsson as manager of AaB. He led the club to the 2013–14 Danish Superliga championship and the 2013–14 Danish Cup.

Managerial statistics

Honours

Player 
Brøndby
Danish championship: 2
 1987, 1988
Danish Cup: 1
 1989

AGF
Danish Cup: 1
 1992

Denmark
UEFA European Football Championship: 1
 1992

Manager 
AaB
Danish Superliga: 1
 2013–14
Danish Cup: 1
 2013–14

References

External links

Danish national team profile
Danish Superliga manager statistics
Danish Superliga player statistics
Kent Nielsen at Brøndby IF

1961 births
Living people
Sportspeople from Frederiksberg
Danish men's footballers
Denmark international footballers
Denmark under-21 international footballers
Brøndby IF players
Aarhus Gymnastikforening players
Danish football managers
Aston Villa F.C. players
AC Horsens managers
1986 FIFA World Cup players
UEFA Euro 1992 players
UEFA European Championship-winning players
AaB Fodbold managers
Aarhus Gymnastikforening managers
Brønshøj Boldklub players
Association football defenders
Odense Boldklub managers
Silkeborg IF managers
Danish Superliga managers